3-Fluoroethamphetamine (3-FEA) is a stimulant drug of the amphetamine class which acts as a releasing agent of the monoamine neurotransmitters norepinephrine, dopamine and serotonin.

Compared to the unsubstituted ethylamphetamine, 3-fluoroethamphetamine is a weaker releaser of noradrenaline, but a stronger releaser of both dopamine and serotonin, and produced the strongest reinforcing effects in animal studies out of a range of 3-substituted ethamphetamine derivatives tested, despite not being the most potent dopamine releaser.

See also 

 2-Fluoroamphetamine
 2-Fluoromethamphetamine
 3-Fluoroamphetamine
 3-Fluoromethamphetamine
 4-Fluoroamphetamine
 4-Fluoromethamphetamine
 Fenfluramine

References 

Designer drugs
Fluoroarenes
Serotonin-norepinephrine-dopamine releasing agents
Stimulants
Substituted amphetamines